Astrid Winkelman (born 3 June 1970 in Rotterdam) is a Dutch former competitive figure skater.

She currently coaches Figure Skating clubs in Haarlem and Utrecht and is the Technical Director of "Dazzling On Tour"

Results

References

External links
Results at Skatebase
Winkelman Figureskating website

1970 births
Living people
Dutch female single skaters
Sportspeople from Rotterdam